Nueva Cajamarca District is one of nine districts of the province Rioja in Peru.

History 
Nueva Cajamarca was established as District on December 26, 1984, during Fernando Belaúnde Terry second term.

Geography

Authorities

Mayors 
 2015-2018: Luis Gilberto Nuñez Sánchez, movimiento Acción Regional.
 2007-2010: Edy Marcelo Tirado Ramos.

References